NGC 4565 (also known as the Needle Galaxy or Caldwell 38) is an edge-on spiral galaxy about 30 to 50 million light-years away in the constellation Coma Berenices. It lies close to the North Galactic Pole and has a visual magnitude of approximately 10.  It is known as the Needle Galaxy for its narrow profile. First recorded in 1785 by William Herschel, it is a prominent example of an edge-on spiral galaxy.

Characteristics 
NGC 4565 is a giant spiral galaxy more luminous than the Andromeda Galaxy.  Much speculation exists in literature as to the nature of the central bulge. In the absence of clear-cut dynamical data on the motions of stars in the bulge, the photometric data alone cannot adjudge among various options put forth. However, its exponential shape suggested that it is a barred spiral galaxy. Studies with the help of the Spitzer Space Telescope not only confirmed the presence of a central bar but also showed a pseudobulge within it as well as an inner ring.

NGC 4565 has at least two satellite galaxies, one of which is interacting with it.  It has a population of roughly 240 globular clusters, more than the Milky Way.

NGC 4565 is one of the brightest member galaxies of the Coma I Group.

This edge-on galaxy exhibits a slightly warped and extended disk under deep optical surveys- likely due to ongoing interactions with neighboring satellite galaxies or other galaxies in the Coma I group. GALEX images show the slight warp at the edge of the disc more clearly than other surveys.

Using the LOw-Frequency ARray (LOFAR), astronomers of the University of Hamburg discovered a diffuse radio halo around NGC 4565. During the observations, a warp was detected in the radio continuum of NGC 4565 that is reminiscent of a neutral hydrogen line (HI) warp and identifying a slight flaring of the galaxy's radio halo. It is assumed that this flaring is caused by the warp as the vertical intensity profiles are asymmetric, which is in agreement with the warp. According to the study, a minimum age for the warp was estimated at approximately 130 million years. This is the spectral age of the galaxy's cosmic ray electrons, during which they are transported into the warp. This indicates that NGC 4565 may be in the aftermath of a period with more intense star formation.

References

External links 
 
 
 National Optical Astronomical Observatory  – NGC 4565
 APOD (2010-03-04) – NGC 4565: Galaxy on Edge
 APOD (2009-04-28) – NGC 4565
 SEDS – NGC 4565

Unbarred spiral galaxies
Coma Berenices
4565
07772
42038
038b
Astronomical objects discovered in 1785
Discoveries by William Herschel
Coma I Group